Thomas and Beulah is a book of poems by American poet Rita Dove that tells the semi-fictionalized chronological story of her maternal grandparents, the focus being on her grandfather (Thomas, his name in the book as well as in real life) in the first half and her grandmother (named Beulah in the book, although her real name was Georgianna) in the second. It won the 1987 Pulitzer Prize for poetry.

Contents

I. Mandolin
The Event
Variation on Pain
Jiving
Straw Hat
Courtship
Refrain
Variation on Guilt
Nothing Down
The Zeppelin Factory
Under the Viaduct, 1932
Lightnin' Blues
Compendium
Definition in the Face of Unnamed Fury
Aircraft
Aurora Borealis
Variation on Gaining a Son
One Volume Missing
The Charm
Gospel
Roast Possum
The Stroke
The Satisfaction Coal Company
Thomas at the Wheel

II. Canary in Bloom
Taking in Wash
Magic
Courtship, Diligence
Promises
Dusting
A Hill of Beans
Weathering Out
Motherhood
Anniversary
The House on Bishop Street
Daystar
Obedience
The Great Palaces of Versailles
Pomade
Headdress
Sunday Greens
Recovery
Nightmare
Wingfoot Lake
Company
The Oriental Ballerina

III. Chronology

Notes and references

External links
Online poem, Straw Hat, from Thomas and Beulah by Rita Dove at alittlepoetry.com

American poetry collections
1986 poetry books
Books published by university presses